Brian or Bryan Stephens may refer to:

Bryan Stephens, baseball player
Brian Stephens, candidate in Sedgefield Council election, 2007
Brian Stephens (cycling), in Giant-Australian Institute of Sport

See also
Brian Stevens (disambiguation)